Aechmea alopecurus is a plant species in the genus Aechmea. This species is endemic to Brazil, known only from the States of Bahia and Minas Gerais.

References

alopecurus
Flora of Brazil
Plants described in 1892